Love is a Dog is the fifth album by Melbourne indie-folk band Tinpan Orange, released on Vitamin Records in April 2016. The album was partially funded by a Pozible campaign which exceeded their goal of $15,000.

Details
The title is a reference to the Charles Bukowski poetry collection, Love is a Dog from Hell.

Singer Emily Lubitz said two of the songs were inspired  by The Great Gatsby. ""Rich Man" is Tom Buchanan and Daisy: super wealthy; they have it all but ... it's empty. "Light Across the Water" is the beacon at the end of their jetty: the unattainable promise of perfect love."

A number of the songs were written or co-written by Emily Lubitz' partner Harry James Angus.

Reception
The Age said, "he band have honed their indie-folk offerings to produce their most cohesive work yet. With its simple acoustic palette and intimate arrangements, it's tempting to call this a stripped back album; but where there's less clutter, there's more space, and though there are fewer hooks, there's more finesse."

Rolling Stone Australia said, "there’s a more ambiguous approach, as they frequently aim for deeper, more flexibly interpretable tales that showcase some of the band’s most confident songwriting to date, making for a strikingly assured album."

Track listing

Personnel
 Jesse Lubitz – Guitar, vocals
 Emily Lubitz - Vocals
 Alex Burkoy - Violin, guitar
 Harry James Angus – Keyboard, guitar, vocals
 Jules Pascoe - Bass
 Danny Pascoe - Drums

References

2016 albums
Tinpan Orange albums
Vitamin Records albums